Daniel Brandon Bilzerian (born December 7, 1980) is an Armenian-American poker player, businessman, and social media influencer.

Early life
Bilzerian was born on December 7, 1980, in Tampa, Florida, the son of corporate takeover specialist Paul Bilzerian and Terri Steffen. He is the brother of fellow poker player Adam Bilzerian. He is of half Armenian descent through his father. His father was a corporate raider on Wall Street who provided both his sons with trust funds. Bilzerian claims to have studied for four years at the University of Florida, majoring in Business and Criminology, but dropped out of college to pursue a professional poker career.

Career

Poker 
Bilzerian played in the 2008 World Series of Poker Main Event, finishing in 180th place. In 2010, he was voted one of the funniest poker players on Twitter by Bluff magazine. In November 2011, Bilzerian was one of those sued by the estate of Bradley Ruderman over winnings from poker games, which were alleged to have been paid with funds from an illegal Ponzi scheme.

That same year, Bilzerian defended Alex Rodriguez publicly against accusations that he had gambled illegally, claiming that he was present when the alleged gambling event had taken place and Rodriguez was not present. In November 2013, Bilzerian posted an unconfirmed claim that he won $10.8 million from a single night of playing poker, and in 2014 he claimed to have won $50 million throughout the year, adding that he "doesn't play against professionals anymore and the most he's ever lost in a single session is $3.6 million." Bilzerian has discussed his Poker career on Joe Rogan's podcast on YouTube.

Ignite 
Bilzerian runs the company Ignite International Brands Ltd., which sells electronic cigarettes, CBD oils, water bottles and vodka, among other products. Ignite is a public company, headquartered in Toronto, Canada, that began trading in January 2019 under the BILZF ticker. The company reportedly lost over $50 million in 2019, mostly on marketing and office rental expenses.

Controversies

Legal issues
In 2014, Bilzerian sued the producers of the film Lone Survivor. His lawsuit stated that he invested $1 million in the film in exchange for at least eight minutes of screen time and 80 words of dialogue, but his role was later reduced to less than one minute and just one line. His lawsuit demanded $1.2 million—the original investment plus 20 percent. The lawsuit was later dropped, and Bilzerian reportedly generated $1.5 million in revenue due to the film's commercial success.

In August 2014, Bilzerian was banned from a Miami nightclub for kicking model Vanessa Castano in the face during a brawl. Bilzerian stated that Castano and another woman attacked Bilzerian's female companion. Castano stated, "There were two girls standing next to me at the table that were fighting. People started getting shoved and I tried to separate them. Then Dan pushed me off the banquette and once I fell he kicked me in the face." Castano later filed a lawsuit against Bilzerian for her injuries. It was also reported that Castano has asked Bilzerian for US$1 million to settle the suit citing the possibility of greater punitive damages based on his income if the suit went to trial.

In 2014, Bilzerian was involved in a legal matter with pornographic actress Janice Griffith. Griffith was featured in a photoshoot with Bilzerian for Hustler magazine in April 2014, which involved Bilzerian throwing her off the roof of a house and into a pool. Griffith fell short of the pool, hitting the edge, and broke her foot. The 18-year-old asked Bilzerian for $85,000 for her injuries, which was rejected. In December 2014 she filed a lawsuit against both Hustler and Bilzerian. Bilzerian's attorney responded that Griffith was under contract for the event by Hustler, that Hustler hired Bilzerian for the event, and that Bilzerian was not at fault. In January 2015, Hustler attorney claimed that the toss was an "act of God" and stated that it was not the publisher's fault that Griffith suffered injuries as a result.

On December 9, 2014, Bilzerian was arrested at Los Angeles International Airport on unrelated bomb-making charges. According to the Los Angeles Police Department, Bilzerian was arrested on a fugitive warrant from Nevada and was booked at the LAPD's Pacific Division around 10 pm: "Bilzerian has been charged with violating a law making it a crime to possess an explosive or incendiary device with the intent to manufacture it." He was released from LAPD custody on the day of his arrest after charges were dropped but was scheduled to be arraigned in January 2015 in Clark County, Nevada. In February 2015, Bilzerian pleaded no contest to a misdemeanor charge of "negligently failing to extinguish a fire in the open" and was fined $17,231.50.

In July 2020, former Ignite president Curtis Heffernan sued Bilzerian for wrongful termination. Heffernan claimed that he was fired for criticizing Bilzerian's misappropriation of company funds for his lavish lifestyle.

Las Vegas shooting
On October 1, 2017, Bilzerian was present at the Las Vegas shooting and filmed himself several times that evening, posting his videos to Instagram. In the first, he described the shooting as he was fleeing to safety. Other videos from the incident depicted Bilzerian searching a police car and requesting a responding police officer to let him use their gun while on the scene. His final two videos showed him returning home, stating "I don't think there's much I can do." Bilzerian was widely criticized for his behavior.

Disputed wealth claims 
Bilzerian claims that his wealth is the outcome of a successful gambling career. However, this claim has been disputed by various people, including, in a widely seen video, professional poker player Doug Polk. Some have speculated that Bilzerian's wealth was instead inherited from his father, corporate takeover specialist Paul Bilzerian. Paul was convicted of various securities law violations in 1989, and in 1993 was ordered to pay over $30 million of his allegedly illegal profits to the SEC. Paul did not pay the money, having filed for bankruptcy in 1991 and then again in 2001. Paul set up a trust fund for his two children, Dan and Adam; Dan's funds became accessible in 2010, when he turned 30. A judge in 2001 accused Paul Bilzerian of hiding his assets in various companies and trusts, including the trust fund for his children. The 2001 bankruptcy judgment showed that, in 1997, Dan and Adam's trust was worth around $12 million in Cimetrix stock, which was meant to be split evenly between the two sons.

Many of the properties Bilzerian claims to own are rented by Ignite International Ltd. As Forbes reports: "The house and everything else—the models, the flights, the yachts, etc.—is charged to the corporate tab of Ignite International Ltd., the company Bilzerian founded and serves as CEO and majority shareholder, according to Curtis Heffernan, Ignite's recently ousted former president. Paying Dan Bilzerian's $2.4 million annual rent, and paying for everything else Dan Bilzerian does, would be one explanation for how Ignite managed to lose a reported $50 million last year."

Personal life

Due to his drug abuse, Bilzerian reportedly suffered two heart attacks before the age of 32.

In 2014, Bilzerian split his time between homes in Hollywood Hills and Los Angeles (California) and Las Vegas (Nevada).
He moved to the Los Angeles neighborhood of Bel Air in 2018. 

On August 28, 2018, Bilzerian flew to Armenia with his brother Adam and father Paul to take their oaths to obtain Armenian citizenship and join the Armenian Armed Forces. 

On that same trip he visited the Republic of Artsakh where he visited a shooting range, and fired weapons there. The government of Azerbaijan sent a note of protest to the United States over these actions due to the contested status of Artsakh, and summoned U.S. Chargé d'Affaires William Gill to take an official note of protest addressed to the State Department. A court in Baku issued an arrest warrant for Bilzerian and put him on the international wanted list. Two years later, Bilzerian and other members of his family donated $250,000 to the Armenia Fund to support Armenia and Artsakh against Azerbaijan during the 2020 Nagorno-Karabakh conflict. He has also declared that he was "very disappointed that Azerbaijan decided to attack the Armenian people".

Politics 

In June 2015, Bilzerian announced his bid to run for President of the United States in the 2016 election.

By December 2015, Bilzerian was praising Donald Trump for being unfiltered, eschewing political correctness, and being pro-gun.

In popular culture
In October 2016, American rapper T-Pain released the song "Dan Bilzerian".

Filmography

Bibliography
The Setup (June 30, 2021)

References

External links

1980 births
Living people
American collectors
American male film actors
American people of Armenian descent
American poker players
California Republicans
Male actors from Tampa, Florida
Candidates in the 2016 United States presidential election
University of Florida alumni
American Internet celebrities